Takht-e Ravan-e Sofla (also Romanized as Takht-e Ravān-e Soflá) is a village in Chaldoran-e Shomali Rural District, in the Central District of Chaldoran County, West Azerbaijan Province, Iran. At the 2006 census, its population was 70, in 14 families.

References 

Populated places in Chaldoran County